The emerald starling (Lamprotornis iris) is also known as the iris glossy starling. It is a small starling with a metallic green crown, upper body, wings and tail. The ear-coverts and underparts are metallic purple. Both sexes are similar. Most taxonomists unite it with many other glossy starlings in Lamprotornis, while others place it in a monotypic genus Coccycolius.

One of the smallest species among starlings, the emerald starling is distributed in West Africa. It inhabits lowlands and savanna of Côte d'Ivoire, Guinea and Sierra Leone.

The emerald starling feeds on figs, Haronga berries and other fruit, seeds, ants and other small insects. The cup-shaped nest is built in a tree cavity. The male and female cooperate in building the nest from leaves, and both bring food to chicks after they hatch. Females possess a brood patch—a spot on their stomach lacking feathers—that helps them transfer body heat to their eggs.

It was formerly classified as data deficient by the IUCN, as available data was insufficient for judging its conservation status. Studies found that it was relatively widespread and locally common, and in 2015 its IUCN rating was changed to least concern. The emerald starling is caught for the wildlife trade and is locally threatened by mining activities, but overall this is unlikely to cause a major decline in the species.

Gallery

References

 Database entry includes justification for why this species is data deficient
BirdLife International (2007): Species factsheet: Coccycolius iris. Retrieved 2007-JUL-20.

emerald starling
emerald starling
Birds of West Africa
emerald starling